The women's 200 metre breaststroke competition of the swimming event at the 2015 Southeast Asian Games was held on 11 June at the OCBC Aquatic Centre in Kallang, Singapore.

Records

Schedule
All times are Singapore Standard Time (UTC+08:00)

Results

Heats

The heats were held on 11 June.

Heat 1

Heat 1 was held on 11 June.

Heat 2

Heat 2 was held on 11 June.

Final

The final was held on 11 June.

References

External links
 

Women's 200 metre breaststroke
Women's sports competitions in Singapore
2015 in women's swimming